Fifi is a submerged tugboat shipwreck located approximately  east of Al-Bander resort in Bahrain. The vessel caught fire and sank in the early 1980s. The ship was owned by Shaheen Bin Saqer bin Shaheen, founder of Awalco Marine. It was named after his only daughter Feryal, who was better known as Fifi.

Currently the wreck site is one of the most popular diving sites in Bahrain. The site is suitable for sport and diving students because the wreck lies in relatively shallow water. The visibility at the wreck site is good, and the currents do not hinder the diving.

References 

Shipwrecks in the Persian Gulf
Wreck diving sites